Tawin Butsombat (born July 22, 1987) is a Thai professional footballer who plays for Khon Kaen United in Thai League 1 as a  winger.

References

External links
 

1987 births
Living people
Tawin Butsombat
Tawin Butsombat
Association football midfielders
Tawin Butsombat
Tawin Butsombat
Tawin Butsombat